Daniel Zammit-Lewis (born 30 April 1993 in Epsom) is a Maltese squash player. He has represented Malta at the Commonwealth Games in 2014 and 2018.

References

1993 births
Living people
Maltese male squash players
Squash players at the 2014 Commonwealth Games
Squash players at the 2018 Commonwealth Games
Commonwealth Games competitors for Malta